The International Convention Against Doping in Sport is a multilateral UNESCO treaty by which states agree to adopt national measures to prevent and eliminate drug doping in sport. The convention was adopted at the General Conference of UNESCO in Paris on 19 October 2005. It entered into force on 1 February 2007 after it had been ratified by 30 state parties. As of October 2022, the convention has been ratified by 189 states, which includes 187 UN member states plus the Cook Islands and State of Palestine.

References

External links
Text.
Ratifications (alphabetical)
Ratifications (by date).

International Convention against Doping in Sport
International Convention against Doping in Sport
International Convention against Doping in Sport
International Convention against Doping in Sport
International Convention against Doping in Sport
International Convention against Doping in Sport
International Convention against Doping in Sport
Treaties of Albania
Treaties of Algeria
Treaties of Andorra
Treaties of Angola
Treaties of Antigua and Barbuda
Treaties of Argentina
Treaties of Armenia
Treaties of Australia
Treaties of Austria
Treaties of Azerbaijan
Treaties of the Bahamas
Treaties of Bahrain
Treaties of Bangladesh
Treaties of Barbados
Treaties of Belarus
Treaties of Belgium
Treaties of Belize
Treaties of Benin
Treaties of Bhutan
Treaties of Bolivia
Treaties of Bosnia and Herzegovina
Treaties of Botswana
Treaties of Brazil
Treaties of Brunei
Treaties of Bulgaria
Treaties of Burkina Faso
Treaties of Burundi
Treaties of Cambodia
Treaties of Cameroon
Treaties of Canada
Treaties of Cape Verde
Treaties of the Central African Republic
Treaties of Chad
Treaties of Chile
Treaties of the People's Republic of China
Treaties of Colombia
Treaties of the Comoros
Treaties of the Republic of the Congo
Treaties of the Cook Islands
Treaties of Costa Rica
Treaties of Ivory Coast
Treaties of Croatia
Treaties of Cuba
Treaties of Cyprus
Treaties of the Czech Republic
Treaties of North Korea
Treaties of the Democratic Republic of the Congo
Treaties of Denmark
Treaties of Djibouti
Treaties of Dominica
Treaties of the Dominican Republic
Treaties of Ecuador
Treaties of Egypt
Treaties of El Salvador
Treaties of Equatorial Guinea
Treaties of Eritrea
Treaties of Estonia
Treaties of Ethiopia
Treaties of Fiji
Treaties of Finland
Treaties of France
Treaties of Gabon
Treaties of the Gambia
Treaties of Georgia (country)
Treaties of Germany
Treaties of Ghana
Treaties of Greece
Treaties of Grenada
Treaties of Guatemala
Treaties of Guinea
Treaties of Guyana
Treaties of Haiti
Treaties of Honduras
Treaties of Hungary
Treaties of Iceland
Treaties of India
Treaties of Indonesia
Treaties of Iran
Treaties of Iraq
Treaties of Ireland
Treaties of Israel
Treaties of Italy
Treaties of Jamaica
Treaties of Japan
Treaties of Jordan
Treaties of Kazakhstan
Treaties of Kenya
Treaties of Kiribati
Treaties of Kuwait
Treaties of Kyrgyzstan
Treaties of Laos
Treaties of Latvia
Treaties of Lebanon
Treaties of Lesotho
Treaties of Liberia
Treaties of the Libyan Arab Jamahiriya
Treaties of Lithuania
Treaties of Luxembourg
Treaties of Madagascar
Treaties of Malawi
Treaties of Malaysia
Treaties of the Maldives
Treaties of Mali
Treaties of Malta
Treaties of the Marshall Islands
Treaties of Mauritania
Treaties of Mauritius
Treaties of Mexico
Treaties of the Federated States of Micronesia
Treaties of Monaco
Treaties of Mongolia
Treaties of Montenegro
Treaties of Morocco
Treaties of Mozambique
Treaties of Myanmar
Treaties of Namibia
Treaties of Nauru
Treaties of Nepal
Treaties of the Netherlands
Treaties of New Zealand
Treaties of Nicaragua
Treaties of Niger
Treaties of Nigeria
Treaties of Norway
Treaties of Oman
Treaties of Pakistan
Treaties of Palau
Treaties of the State of Palestine
Treaties of Panama
Treaties of Papua New Guinea
Treaties of Paraguay
Treaties of Peru
Treaties of the Philippines
Treaties of Poland
Treaties of Portugal
Treaties of Qatar
Treaties of South Korea
Treaties of Moldova
Treaties of Romania
Treaties of Russia
Treaties of Rwanda
Treaties of Samoa
Treaties of San Marino
Treaties of São Tomé and Príncipe
Treaties of Saudi Arabia
Treaties of Senegal
Treaties of Serbia
Treaties of Seychelles
Treaties of Singapore
Treaties of Slovakia
Treaties of Slovenia
Treaties of the Transitional Federal Government of Somalia
Treaties of South Africa
Treaties of Spain
Treaties of Sri Lanka
Treaties of Saint Kitts and Nevis
Treaties of Saint Lucia
Treaties of Saint Vincent and the Grenadines
Treaties of the Solomon Islands
Treaties of Sudan
Treaties of Suriname
Treaties of Eswatini
Treaties of Sweden
Treaties of Switzerland
Treaties of Syria
Treaties of Tajikistan
Treaties of Tanzania
Treaties of Thailand
Treaties of North Macedonia
Treaties of Togo
Treaties of Tonga
Treaties of Trinidad and Tobago
Treaties of Tunisia
Treaties of Turkey
Treaties of Turkmenistan
Treaties of Tuvalu
Treaties of Uganda
Treaties of Ukraine
Treaties of the United Arab Emirates
Treaties of the United Kingdom
Treaties of the United States
Treaties of Uruguay
Treaties of Uzbekistan
Treaties of Vanuatu
Treaties of Venezuela
Treaties of Vietnam
Treaties of Yemen
Treaties of Zambia
Treaties of Zimbabwe
Treaties extended to Aruba
Treaties extended to the Netherlands Antilles
Treaties extended to Jersey
Treaties extended to Guernsey
Treaties extended to the Isle of Man
Treaties extended to Bermuda
Treaties extended to the Cayman Islands
Treaties extended to the Falkland Islands
Treaties extended to the British Virgin Islands
Treaties extended to Hong Kong
Treaties extended to Macau
Sports treaties